Upper Mount Gravatt busway station is located in Brisbane, Australia serving the suburb of Upper Mount Gravatt. It opened on 30 April 2001 when the South East Busway was extended from Woolloongabba to Eight Mile Plains.

It was built beneath the existing Garden City bus station at Westfield Garden City. It is served by 10 routes operated by Brisbane Transport, Clarks Logan City Bus Service, Mt Gravatt Bus Service and Transdev Queensland as part of the TransLink network.

References

External links
[ Upper Mount Gravatt station] TransLink

Bus stations in Brisbane
Transport infrastructure completed in 2001